Star of the Sea (Italian: Stella del mare) is a 1938 Italian "white-telephones" comedy film directed by Corrado D'Errico and starring Galliano Masini, Luisa Ferida and Germana Paolieri.

It was made at Cinecittà Studios. The film's sets were designed by Salvo D'Angelo.

Cast
 Galliano Masini as Gianni Massari  
 Luisa Ferida as Luisa  
 Germana Paolieri as Gemma Cherubini  
 Mario Brizzolari as Il commendator Colombo  
 Luigi Almirante as Nino Rossetti  
 Guglielmo Sinaz as Francesco 
 Nino Altieri 
 Armando Arzalesi 
 Giovanni Ferrari 
 Walter Grant 
 Fausto Guerzoni 
 Carlo Lombardi 
 Renato Malavasi
 Ferruccio Manzetti 
 Gino Massi 
 Pietro Nofri 
 Ubaldo Noris 
 Diego Pozzetto

References

Bibliography 
 Enrico Lancia. Dizionario del cinema italiano: Dal 1930 al 1944. Gremese Editore, 2005.

External links 
 
 Star of the Sea at Variety Distribution 

1938 comedy films
Italian comedy films
1938 films
1930s Italian-language films
Films directed by Corrado D'Errico
Italian black-and-white films
Films shot at Cinecittà Studios
1930s Italian films